A Pocketful of Rye is a 1969 novel by A. J. Cronin about a young Scottish doctor, Carroll, and his life in Switzerland. It is a sequel to A Song of Sixpence.

As with several of his other novels, Cronin drew on his own experiences as a doctor for this book. The titles of both novels come from the children's nursery rhyme, Sing a Song of Sixpence.

References

Novels by A. J. Cronin
Sequel novels
Novels set in Switzerland
1969 British novels
Medical novels
Victor Gollancz Ltd books
Little, Brown and Company books